The 1935 All-Big Six Conference football team consists of American football players chosen by various organizations for All-Big Six Conference teams for the 1935 college football season. The selectors for the 1935 season included the Associated Press (AP).

All-Big Six selections

Backs
 Lloyd Cardwell, Nebraska (AP-1)
 Jerry LaNoue, Nebraska (AP-1)
 Sam Francis, Nebraska (AP-1)
 Leo Ayers, Kansas State (AP-1)

Ends
 Rutherford Hayes, Kansas (AP-1)
 Bernie Scherer, Nebraska (AP-1)

Tackles
 Fred Shirey, Nebraska (AP-1)
 J. W. "Dub" Wheeler, Oklahoma (AP-1)

Guards
 Dick Sklar, Kansas (AP-1)
 Ike Hayes, Iowa State (AP-1)

Centers
 Edwin Phelps, Kansas (AP-1)

Key
AP = Associated Press

See also
1935 College Football All-America Team

References

All-Big Six Conference football team
All-Big Eight Conference football teams